The 1933–1934 SM-sarja season was the first one to be played as a League rather than a Cup. There was 4 Teams from 2 cities participating. 

The 4 teams played 3 games each. The team who wins the regular season wins the championship

SM-sarja Championship 

Helsingfors Skridskoklubb wins the 1933–34 SM-sarja championship.

References
 Hockey Archives

Liiga seasons
1933–34 in Finnish ice hockey
Fin